Manchester is a city in Northwest England.  The M16 postcode area is to the south of the city centre, and contains the area of Whalley Range.  The postcode area contains 12 listed buildings that are recorded in the National Heritage List for England.  Of these, one is listed at Grade II*, the middle grade of the three grades, and the others are at Grade II, the lowest grade.

The area, which is mainly residential, was developed in the middle of the 19th century, and at this time a number of educational buildings were also established.  The listed buildings consist of houses, churches, colleges and schools, some of which have changed their purposes since they were first established.


Key

Buildings

Notes and references

Notes

Citations

Sources

Lists of listed buildings in Greater Manchester
Buildings and structures in Manchester